The 2013 World Women's U18 Championship Division I final tournament was played in Romanshorn, Switzerland, from 2 to 8 January 2013. Japan won the tournament and after two years in Division I they returned to the Top Division.

Qualification tournament
The qualification tournament was played in Dumfries, Great Britain, from 27 October to 1 November 2012. The top two teams, France and Slovakia, were promoted to Division I of this year, but starting in 2014 one team will be promoted from the qualification tournament and will wait until the following year (2015) to play in Division I. Though not indicated at the time of the tournament, the 2014 schedule indicates that Austria was relegated to the qualification level, and Great Britain was promoted.

Final standings

The game Kazakhstan – Italy was forfeited (0–5) because the Kazakh team arrived too late.

Final tournament

Final standings

Results
All times are local (CET – UTC+01).

References

External links 
 IIHF.com

2013
World
World
2013